Józef Żmij was a Polish soldier and politician in the period before the World War II. During the Silesian Uprisings he took part in the fights around the village of Wisła Wielka in the rank of 2nd Lieutenant. After the war, in 1930s, he became the mayor of the town of Pszczyna, where he married Filomena née Kopeć . Arrested by the Germans after the Polish Defensive War, he was imprisoned in Mauthausen-Gusen concentration camp.

Polish politicians
Polish soldiers
19th-century births
20th-century deaths
Year of birth missing
Year of death missing